Selenium oxydichloride is the inorganic compound with the formula SeOCl2. It is a colorless liquid.  With a high dielectric constant (55) and high specific conductance, it is an attractive solvent. Structurally, it is a close chemical relative of thionyl chloride SOCl2, being a pyramidal molecule.

Preparation and reactions
Selenium oxydichloride can be prepared by several methods, and a common one involves the conversion of selenium dioxide to dichloroselenious acid followed by dehydration:
SeO2  +  2 HCl   →  Se(OH)2Cl2
Se(OH)2Cl2   →  SeOCl2  +  H2O
The original synthesis involved the redistribution reaction of selenium dioxide and selenium tetrachloride.

The compound hydrolyzes readily to form hydrogen chloride and selenium dioxide.

See also

 Selenium oxybromide SeOBr2
 Selenous acid H2SeO3

References

Selenium(IV) compounds
Oxychlorides
Inorganic solvents